Adiponectin receptor 2 (AdipoR2) is a protein which in humans is encoded by the ADIPOR2 gene. It is a member of the progestin and adipoQ receptor (PAQR) family, and is also known as PAQR2.

Structure
Similar to G protein-coupled receptors (GPCRs), AdipoR2 also possesses 7 transmembrane domains.  However, AdipoR2 is orientated oppositely to GPCRs in the membrane (i.e., cytoplasmic N-terminus, extracellular C-terminus) and does not associate with G proteins.

Function 
The adiponectin receptors, AdipoR1 and AdipoR2, serve as receptors for globular and full-length adiponectin  and mediate increased AMPK and PPAR-α ligand activities, as well as fatty acid oxidation and glucose uptake by adiponectin.  In 2016, the University of Tokyo announced that it would launch an investigation into claims of fabrication of AdipoR1 and AdipoR2 identification data, as accused by an anonymous person/group called Ordinary_researchers.

Ligands

Agonists

Peptide
 Adiponectin
 ADP-355
 ADP-399

Non-peptide
 AdipoRon
 Deoxyschizandrin
 Parthenolide
 Syringing
 Taxifoliol

Antagonists

Peptide
 ADP-400

See also 
 Adiponectin receptor
 Adiponectin receptor 1

References

External links
 

7TM receptors